is the second studio album of Japanese band Zard. It was released on December 25, 1991 released under B-Gram label. In 1991, B-Gram released this album in cassette tape and CD format. In 1993, B-Gram Records re-released this album only in CD format (BGCH-1004).

Background
The album consists of two previously released singles.

"Sunao ni Ienakute" and "Itsuka wa" are both composed by singer/frontman Izumi Sakai.

In 2009, the song Sunao ni Ienakute was re-arranged and released as single; the song was re-arranged by Hitoshi Okamoto, a member of Garnet Crow. Mai Kuraki joined in on the chorus.

Chart performance
The album reached #36 rank first week. It charted for 57 weeks and sold 333,000 copies.

Track listing

In media
Mō Sagasanai: theme song for TV Asahi Japanese television drama "Shichinin no Onna Bengoushi"
Fushigi ne...: ending theme for Nihon TV program "Magical Zunou Power!"

References 

Zard albums
1991 albums
Being Inc. albums
Japanese-language albums
Albums produced by Daiko Nagato